Katarina Pračková (born 12 January 1985) is a Slovak footballer who plays as a defender for I. liga žien club ŠK Slovan Bratislava. She has been a member of the Slovakia women's national team.

International career
Pračková capped for Slovakia at senior level during the 2011 FIFA Women's World Cup qualification – UEFA Group 2.

References

1985 births
Living people
Women's association football defenders
Slovak women's footballers
Slovakia women's international footballers
ŠK Slovan Bratislava (women) players